The Heron Corn Mill is a working 18th-century water mill on the River Bela at Beetham, Cumbria, England.  The mill and its mill race are grade II* listed, and in 2013 it was awarded a £939,000 grant from the Heritage Lottery Fund for major restoration work.

The mill is  open to visitors, with regular opportunities to see flour being milled. The 18th century barn is used as a venue for a range of community and educational activities.

Within the mill site there is also a Kaplan turbine generating hydroelectricity, some of which is sold to the BillerudKorsnäs paper mill across the river.

A fish ladder bypassing the weir allows salmon to pass up the river to breed.

See also

Grade II* listed buildings in South Lakeland
Listed buildings in Beetham

References

External links

Watermills in Cumbria
Grade II* listed buildings in Cumbria
Grade II* listed watermills
Museums in Cumbria
Mill museums in England
Beetham